The 2003–04 SM-liiga season was the 29th season of the SM-liiga, the top level of ice hockey in Finland. 13 teams participated in the league, and Kärpät Oulu won the championship.

Regular season

Playoffs

Preliminary round
 Jokerit - JYP 2:0 (5:2, 3:2)
 Tappara - Blues 1:2 (1:2 P, 4:1, 0:2)

Quarterfinals
 TPS - Blues 4:2 (3:2, 2:4, 4:0, 2:3, 4:2, 2:0)
 Kärpät - Jokerit 4:2 (3:2, 3:2, 2:5, 2:1, 1:2, 2:1)
 HIFK - Ilves 4:3 (3:1, 2:3, 0:3, 2:4, 3:0, 1:0, 4:3)
 HPK - Lukko 4:0 (3:2, 5:0, 4:0, 3:1)

Semifinals
 TPS - HPK 3:0 (2:0, 4:3 P, 3:1)
 Kärpät - HIFK 3:2 (3:2 P, 2:4, 0:5, 3:2 P, 3:2 P)

3rd place
 HIFK - HPK 3:1

Final
 TPS - Kärpät 1:3 (1:2, 3:4 P, 5:0, 0:1 P)

External links
 SM-liiga official website

1
Finnish
Liiga seasons